The Singapore International Violin Competition (SIVC) is a triennial violin competition for violinists up to the age of 30. The contest is hosted by the Yong Siew Toh Conservatory of Music and has been held in Singapore since 2015. The competition promotes the continued growth and strength of classical music in the region, and showcases young violinists from around the world.

Venues
 Esplanade – Theatres on the Bay
 Victoria Theatre and Concert Hall
 Yong Siew Toh Conservatory of Music Concert Hall

Prizes

Special Prizes

 Top 6 winners are eligible for a 3-year fine violin loan from the Rin Collection.

Results

a The 2021 competition was postponed to December 2022 due to the COVID-19 pandemic.

See also
 List of classical music competitions

References

External links
 

Violin competitions
Triennial events
Classical music awards
Recurring events established in 2015